Perfect Strangers, also released as Too Dangerous to Love in some territories, is a 1950 American comedy-drama film directed by Bretaigne Windust. Edith Sommer wrote the screenplay from an adaptation written by George Oppenheimer, based on the 1939 play Ladies and Gentlemen by Charles MacArthur and Ben Hecht. The film stars Ginger Rogers and Dennis Morgan as two jurors who fall in love while sequestered during a murder trial. Thelma Ritter, Margalo Gillmore, and Anthony Ross co-star in supporting roles.

The film was released by Warner Bros. on March 24, 1950, and received mixed to negative reviews from critics.

Plot
Terry Scott (Ginger Rogers), who is separated from her husband, and unhappily married David Campbell (Dennis Morgan), the father of two children, meet when they are selected to serve on the jury of the Los Angeles trial of Ernest Craig (Ford Rainey). The defendant is charged with murdering his wife when she refused to grant him a divorce. David attempts to get out of being a juror. Terry Scott attempts to persuade the rest of the jury that the defendant is innocent until proven guilty. While sequestered during the lengthy proceedings, Terry and David get to know each other and fall in love. Some dramatic tension is added to the plot by juror Isobel Bradford (Margalo Gillmore), a snobby socialite who tries to sway the panel to vote for the death penalty.  Due to the mix of personalities, and cramped quarters, other tensions, some comical, arise between the fellow jurors.

Cast

 Ginger Rogers as Theresa "Terry" Scott
 Dennis Morgan as David Campbell
 Thelma Ritter as Lena Fassler
 Margalo Gillmore as Mrs. Isobel Bradford
 Anthony Ross as Robert "Bob" Fisher  
 Howard Freeman as Arthur Timkin  
 Alan Reed as Harry Patullo
 Paul Ford as Judge Byron
 Harry Bellaver as Bailiff
 George Chandler as Lester Hubley  
 Frank Conlan as John Brokaw
 Charles Meredith as Lyle Pettijohn  
 Marjorie Bennett as Mrs. Moore  
 Edith Evanson as Mary Travers  
 Sumner Getchell as John Simon

Unbilled (in order of appearance)

 Ford Rainey as Ernest Craig
 Whit Bissell as Defense attorney
 Ned Glass as O'Hanlon
 Creighton Hale as Reporter
 Frank Marlowe as Reporter
 Frank Cady as Geologist
 Isabel Withers
 Weldon Heyburn

Production
Production on the film took place from late June to early August 1949. The film marked a reunion between Rogers and Morgan, who had previously co-starred together as lovers in the highly successful Kitty Foyle; since that pairing, Rogers had notably become a free agent in Hollywood. Margalo Gillmore was a friend of Ladies and Gentleman writers Hecht and MacArthur.

Critical reception
The film received mixed reviews from critics. In his review in The New York Times, Bosley Crowther described the film as "modest entertainment" of which "the limits of plausibility are unmistakably stretched"; The romance elements were negatively reviewed, a much different reception than the Rogers/Morgan pairing had received for Kitty Foyle. A review for Rotarian magazine said the storyline "lacks motivation and hence will not claim much of your sympathy." Crowther had similar feelings, stating "Miss Rogers and Mr. Morgan are pretty dreary throughout the film. However, their fellow jurors are a remarkably entertaining lot, picturesque in theatrical fashion, and the minor salvation of the show." Crowther did, however, praise Windust's direction, stating that "in spite of the weak script, Bretaigne Windust has done the best with his batch of characters... Jerry Wald, who produced for Warners, should thank him more than the writers, one and all."

References

External links
 
 
 
 

1950 films
1950 comedy-drama films
American black-and-white films
American comedy-drama films
American courtroom films
American films based on plays
American legal drama films
Films directed by Bretaigne Windust
Films scored by Leigh Harline
Films set in Los Angeles
Juries in fiction
Warner Bros. films
1950s English-language films
1950s American films